In mathematics, a function defined on a region of the complex plane is said to be of bounded type if it is equal to the ratio of two analytic functions bounded in that region. Being the ratio of two bounded analytic functions is a sufficient condition for a function to be of bounded type (defined in terms of a harmonic majorant), and if  is simply connected the condition is also necessary.

The Nevanlinna class includes all the Hardy classes.

Functions of bounded type are not necessarily bounded, nor do they have a property called "type" which is bounded. The reason for the name is probably that when defined on a disc, the Nevanlinna characteristic (a function of distance from the centre of the disc) is bounded.

Clearly, if a function is the ratio of two bounded functions, then it can be expressed as the ratio of two functions which are bounded by 1:

The latter is the real part of an analytic function and is therefore harmonic, showing that  has a harmonic majorant on Ω.

For a given region, sums, differences, and products of functions of bounded type are of bounded type, as is the quotient of two such functions as long as the denominator is not identically zero.

Examples
Polynomials are of bounded type in any bounded region. They are also of bounded type in the upper half-plane (UHP), because a polynomial  of degree n can be expressed as a ratio of two analytic functions bounded in the UHP:

with

The inverse of a polynomial is also of bounded type in a region, as is any rational function.

The function  is of bounded type in the UHP if and only if a is real.

Sine and cosine are of bounded type in the UHP. Indeed,

with

both of which are bounded in the UHP.

All of the above examples are of bounded type in the lower half-plane as well, using different P and Q functions. But the region mentioned in the definition of the term "bounded type" cannot be the whole complex plane unless the function is constant because one must use the same P and Q over the whole region, and the only entire functions (that is, analytic in the whole complex plane) which are bounded are constants, by Liouville's theorem.

Another example in the upper half-plane is a "Nevanlinna function", that is, an analytic function that maps the UHP to the closed UHP. If f(z) is of this type, then

where P and Q are the bounded functions:

Properties
For a given region, the sum, product, or quotient of two (non-null) functions of bounded type is also of bounded type. The set of functions of bounded type is an algebra over the complex numbers and is in fact a field.

One can then express this quotient as

Each of these in turn can be expressed by a Poisson representation (see Nevanlinna functions):

where c and d are imaginary constants, p and q are non-negative real constants, and μ and ν are non-decreasing functions of a real variable (well behaved so the integrals converge). The difference q−p has been given the name "mean type" by Louis de Branges and describes the growth or decay of the function along the imaginary axis:

If an entire function is of bounded type in both the upper and the lower half-plane then it is of exponential type equal to the higher of the two respective "mean types" (and the higher one will be non-negative). An entire function of order greater than 1 (which means that in some direction it grows faster than a function of exponential type) cannot be of bounded type in any half-plane.

We may thus produce a function of bounded type by using an appropriate exponential of z and exponentials of arbitrary Nevanlinna functions multiplied by i, for example:

Concerning the examples given above, the mean type of polynomials or their inverses is zero.

Functions of bounded type in the upper half-plane with non-positive mean type and having a continuous, square-integrable extension to the real axis have the interesting property (useful in applications) that the integral (along the real axis)

equals  if z is in the upper half-plane and zero if z is in the lower half-plane. This may be termed the Cauchy formula for the upper half-plane.

See also
De Branges space
Rolf Nevanlinna

References 

 
 

Complex analysis
Special functions
Types of functions